Jarinu is a municipality in the state of São Paulo in Brazil. The population is 30,617 (2020 est.) in an area of 208 km². The elevation is 755 m.

References

Municipalities in São Paulo (state)